Andrejs is a Latvian masculine given name. It is a cognate of the name Andrew and may refer to:
Andrejs Apsītis (1888–1945), Latvian cyclist and Olympic competitor
Andrejs Auzāns (1871-1953), Latvian military general and topographer
Andrejs Butriks (born 1982), Latvian football forward and sporting director
Andrejs Dūda (born 1981), Latvian swimmer and Olympic competitor
Andrejs Elksniņš (born 1982), Latvian politician 
Andrejs Everitt (born 1989), Australian rules footballer
Andrejs Freimanis (1914-1994), Latvian Obersturmführer in the Waffen SS during World War II
Andrejs Grants (born 1955), Latvian photographer and teacher
Andrejs Gražulis (born 1993), Latvian basketball player 
Andrejs Kapmals (1889–1994), Latvian track and field athlete and Olympic competitor
Andrejs Kiriļins (born 1995), Latvian footballer
Andrejs Klementjevs (born 1973), Latvian politician
Andrejs Krūkliņš (1891-2001), Latvian track and field athlete and Olympic competitor
Andrejs Koroļevs (born 1969), Latvian-born Polish motorcycle speedway rider
Andrejs Kovaļovs (born 1989), Latvian football midfielder
Andrejs Mamikins (born 1976), Latvian politician and journalist 
Andrejs Maticins (born 1963), Latvian ice hockey player and coach
Andrejs Osokins (born 1984), Latvian pianist 
Andrejs Pavlovs (born 1979), Latvian football goalkeeper
Andrejs Perepļotkins (born 1984), Ukrainian-born Latvian football forward and midfielder
Andrejs Piedels (born 1970), Latvian football goalkeeper and assistant coach
Andrejs Pildegovics (born 1971), Latvian diplomat and ambassador
Andrejs Prohorenkovs (born 1977), Latvian football striker
Andrejs Pumpurs (1841–1902), Latvian poet and independence activist
Andrejs Rastorgujevs (born 1988), Latvian biathlete and Olympic competitor
Andrejs Rubins (born 1978), Latvian football midfielder
Andrejs Šeļakovs (born 1988), Latvian basketball centre
Andrejs Štolcers (born 1974), Latvian football attacking midfielder and coach
Andrejs Upīts (1877– 1970), Latvian teacher, poet, short story writer and Communist polemicist
Andrejs Vlascenko (born 1974), German-born Russian figure skater who competed for Latvia and Olympic competitor

Latvian masculine given names